Hal Chapman Wingo III (born September 19, 1963), known as Trey Wingo, is the former co-host of ESPN Golic and Wingo, SportsCenter, and NFL Live. He has previously served as host of the Women's NCAA basketball tournament.

Biography

Early life
Wingo is the son of Hal Wingo, founding editor of People magazine. He grew up in Greenwich, Connecticut, where he attended high school with Steve Young, and attended Baylor University, where he was a member of the Phi Delta Theta fraternity. He graduated in 1985 with a bachelor's degree in communications.

Pre-ESPN career (1987–1997)
Wingo began his career with NBC News at Sunrise in New York City. He worked as a sports director at WMGC-TV in Binghamton, New York, from 1988 to 1990; at WFMZ-TV in Allentown, Pennsylvania; at WICZ-TV in Binghamton; and at KSDK-TV in St. Louis, Missouri, from 1991 to 1997.

ESPN (1997–2020)
Wingo was the play-by-play announcer for the Arena Football League on ESPN with Mark Schlereth. With Bob Ley he appeared on the lone September 11, 2001, segment of SportsCenter to announce that there would be no NFL games played that week.

He hosted NFL Primetime, which airs after Monday Night Football; NFL Live; and Who's No. 1?. On November 27, 2017, he became the co-host of the ESPN Radio morning show with Mike Golic, replacing Mike Greenberg upon the latter's departure for Get Up!, a new ESPN television show.

Wingo lent his voice and likeness to the video games ESPN NFL 2K5, in which he can be unlocked as a free agent; NFL Head Coach, in which he can be seen hosting a virtual NFL Live show; and NFL Tour, in which he serves as the play-by-play voice. He has also appeared in a campaign for the RW Sport luxury collection by Swiss watchmaker Raymond Weil. On September 4, 2020 it was announced Wingo left ESPN.

Pro Football Network (2021)
On March 13, 2021, Pro Football Network (PFN) announced that Trey Wingo had joined the company as an equity partner, brand ambassador, and content provider. In the official news release from PFN, Wingo said, "I’m excited about the new venture going forward. I’ve been extremely impressed with what Pro Football Network has started and I’m looking forward to helping them achieve new heights in any way I can.”

Wingo hosts a podcast with PFN called More than Football: A Trey Wingo Podcast, which can be found on Apple and Spotify. Additionally, he also creates and contributes to content around the year at major events, including Hall of Fame Enshrinement Week, Super Bowl, NFL Combine, NFL Draft, and more.

Personal life
Wingo is married to Janice Parmelee with whom he has 5 kids. 
He became an official supporter of Ronald McDonald House Charities in 2007 and is a member of their celebrity board, called the Friends of RMHC. He works closely with the Prostate Cancer Foundation, the V Foundation for Cancer Research, the Special Olympics, and the Children's Hospital of Chicago.

References

External links
Pro Football Network
Trey Wingo profile, espnmediazone.com, November 2009; accessed July 4, 2015
Hal Wingo profile
Broadcaster's unusual journey

Baylor University alumni
Living people
1963 births
People from Greenwich, Connecticut
Arena football announcers
American television sports anchors
National Football League announcers
Women's college basketball announcers in the United States
Greenwich High School alumni